Ambrósio Francisco Ferro (? - October 3, 1645) was a Brazilian priest and is a saint of the Catholic Church.

Biography

Francisco Ferro, a native of Azores, came to Brazil with relatives. He was ordained priest and from 1636 he was a parish priest in Natal. On October 3, 1645, Ambrosio Francisco Ferro, was martyred at the hands of the Dutch military unit, along with 28 faithful, among whom were his relatives, on the Uruaçu River.

His beatification was performed by Pope John Paul II on March 5, 2000, along with the beatification of André de Soveral and his companions.

On March 23, 2017, Pope Francis signed a decree recognizing the miracle through the intercession of Blessed Ambrósio Francisco Ferro, and on April 20, 2017 during the consistory, he set the date of his canonization. 

The writing of his name as saints along with 34 new saints took place on October 15, 2017 at St. Peter's Square by Pope Francis.

References

External links

 Catholic Saints Page
 Biography of André de Soveral, Ambrósio Francisco Ferro e 28 companions

Date of birth unknown
1645 deaths
17th-century Brazilian Roman Catholic priests
Brazilian Roman Catholic saints
Beatifications by Pope John Paul II
Canonizations by Pope Francis
People from the Azores